Marie Matiko (born September 12, 1970) is an American actress.

Early life

Marie Matiko is of Chinese, Japanese and Filipino descent, born in Los Angeles County and grew up in Huntington Beach. She grew up wanting to become a concert pianist. In high school, she auditioned for The Young Americans, where she was taught singing, dancing and performing in a conservatory setting.

She was an environmental engineering major at UCLA. While still in college, she auditioned for the first national tour of Miss Saigon. She traded an ROTC scholarship for the role of "Gigi/Mimi" when she was picked by producer Cameron Mackintosh for the first national tour of Miss Saigon. While on the road, she continued taking academic classes at community colleges. She was inspired by The Joy Luck Club to pursue film acting and after leaving Miss Saigon, Matiko returned to Los Angeles to pursue it.

In 2008, Matiko finished her degree from UCLA during the Hollywood Writer's Strike.

Film and television
Matiko is known for her starring roles as Julia in The Art of War and as Betty in the 2006 film Date Movie.

For her performance in The Art of War, she garnered the nomination for Best Actress in a Feature Film at the 2001 AX Awards (the Asian-American Film and TV awards). Matiko was one of the AX Awards Top 20 Newcomers in 2006.

In New Line Cinema's The Corruptor, produced by Oliver Stone, Marie Lan Matiko debuted on film as the love interest of Chow Yun-Fat. Challenging acting work from the start, she won the role of May, a heroin-addict and indentured servant trapped by NY Chinatown's Triads. Under the direction of James Foley (Glengarry Glen Ross), Chow Yun-Fat and Mark Wahlberg share textured scene work alongside Matiko.

In Fox's 2007 release Date Movie, Matiko made her comedic debut alongside Fred Willard and Jennifer Coolidge, playing Betty.

In the 2007 Dennis the Menace Christmas, she played Mrs. Walsh-Mellman, Dennis's grade school teacher. Matiko also voices the group therapist of Dennis's frustrated parents.

Additional film and television credits include Universal's Mystery Men, TBS's Counterstrike, CBS's The District and Michael Mann's Robbery Homicide Division. Matiko voiced Gong Li's parts in Michael Mann's Miami Vice and voiced opposite Lucy Liu and Patrick Warburton in the Carsey-Werner Production, UPN's Game Over in television's first full-length CGI cartoon. She was also in Forbidden Warrior, where Matiko plays Seki, the forbidden warrior.

Matiko was also on the popular TV series Xena playing the roles of Pao Ssu and K'ao Hsin, the twin daughters of Xena's spiritual mentor, Lao Ma. Her characters are on several collectible Xena:The Warrior Princess trading cards.

Outside acting
Matiko founded and ran the non-profit Vivace Conservatory, with co-founder Ariel Felix. Vivace is a non-profit performing arts school located in Los Angeles Chinatown. The purpose of the organization is to nurture pride, self-discipline and passion in disadvantaged inner-city youth and minorities for the arts. in regards to Vivace, she stated:

Matiko was the celebrity spokesperson for the California Asian American Democratic Caucus.
Matiko also sits on the board of advisors for the San Diego Asian American Film Festival.

Filmography

Film and TV Movies

Television

References

External links

Marie Matiko's official site
Rotten Tomatoes
Yahoo! movies

American film actresses
Living people
American actresses of Chinese descent
American actresses of Filipino descent
1970 births
UCLA Graduate School of Education and Information Studies alumni
American actresses of Japanese descent
American film actors of Asian descent
California Democrats
Actresses from Huntington Beach, California
The Young Americans members
21st-century American women